Wallace "Wally" Amos, Jr. (born July 1, 1936) is an American television personality,  entrepreneur, and author from Tallahassee, Florida. He is the founder of the Famous Amos chocolate-chip cookie, the Cookie Kahuna, and Aunt Della's Cookies gourmet cookie brands, and he was the host of the adult reading program, Learn to Read.

Early life and education 
Amos was born to Wallace & Ruby Amos.
He was born and raised in Tallahassee, Florida, until he was 12 years old. When his parents divorced, he moved to New York City with his aunt, where he enrolled at the Food Trades Vocational High School. He showed his interest in cooking at a young age. It was from his aunt Della Bryant, who would bake cookies for him, that Amos later developed his chocolate chip cookie recipe. 

Shortly before graduation, Amos dropped out of high school to join the United States Air Force. He served at Hickam Air Force Base in Honolulu, Hawaii from 1954 until 1957. He earned his high school equivalency diploma before being honorably discharged from the military.

Career 
Returning to New York City, Amos went to college to become a secretary, and after graduating, took a mailroom clerk job with the William Morris Agency. Eventually, he became the agency's first African American talent agent. He signed Simon & Garfunkel and headed the agency's rock 'n' roll department. Amos attracted clients by sending them chocolate chip cookies along with an invitation to visit him. He represented musicians such as The Temptations, Sam Cooke, and Marvin Gaye.

In 1975, a friend suggested to Amos that he set up a store to sell his cookies, and in March of that year, the first Famous Amos cookie store opened in Los Angeles, California. He started the business with the help of a $25,000 loan from Marvin Gaye and Helen Reddy. The company began to expand, and eventually, Famous Amos chocolate chip cookies could be found on supermarket shelves across the United States. He became such a known figure culturally that he appeared as himself in the Taxi episode "Latka's Cookies", in 1981. Thanks in part to the success of his cookie company, he was hired to deliver speeches. He has written 10 books, many of which have a self-help theme, including The Cookie Never Crumbles and The Power in You.

In 1979, Amos' long-time friend and publicist John Rosica introduced him to Literacy Volunteers of America. Amos has advocated literacy and helped thousands of adults learn to read.  In 1987, he also hosted a television series designed to teach others how to read, entitled Learn to Read, produced by Kentucky Educational Television and WXYZ-TV.

Due to financial troubles, Amos was forced to sell the Famous Amos Company, and because the name "Famous Amos" was trademarked by his former company, he had to use The Uncle Noname's Cookie Company as his new company's name. A Famous Amos distributor at the time, Lou Avignone, heard Amos on a local radio talk show and, inspired by Amos' story of his early business success with Famous Amos and his spirit, contacted Amos with the idea for starting a new business. In 1994, the two became partners and subsequently launched Uncle Noname Gourmet Muffins. The company focused on fat-free, nutritious muffins at that time. Uncle Noname became Uncle Wally's Muffin Company in 1999. The muffins are sold in more than 3,500 stores nationwide.

In 2014, an article in Fortune magazine lauded "The cookie comeback of 'Famous' Wally Amos" as Amos brought back his handmade cookies under a new name The Cookie Kahuna. These cookies were marketed in a store in Hawaii, where Amos was based. They come in the flavors original chocolate chip, chocolate chip with pecans and butterscotch with macadamia nuts.

In 2019, Amos was called "the King of cookies" by NBC affiliate KSNV-TV in Las Vegas.

In 2020, Content Media Group released a documentary on the life of Wally Amos, The Great Cookie Comeback: reBaking Wally Amos. The film was directed by Jeff MacIntyre.

Personal life

On July 1, 1979, Amos married Christine (Harris) Amos, who later helped him design the early merchandise and packaging for Famous Amos cookies. Wally Amos has 4 children: Michael Amos, Gregory Amos, Sarah Amos, and musician Shawn Amos.

Amos had lived in Hawaii from 1977 until 2018. Amos currently resides in Columbia, South Carolina, where he is working on Aunt Della's Cookies.

Publications

Authored

Contributions

Books

Audio books

Filmography

References

External links
 Famous Amos Cookies
 Uncle Wally's

1936 births
20th-century African-American people
21st-century African-American people
African-American businesspeople
African-American non-fiction writers
Businesspeople from Florida
Businesspeople from New York (state)
Businesspeople from New York City
American food company founders
American non-fiction writers
American self-help writers
Living people
United States Air Force airmen
Writers from New York City
Writers from Tallahassee, Florida